Jeremy Johnson (born September 23, 1994) is an American football quarterback who plays for the Caudillos de Chihuahua of the Liga de Fútbol Americano Profesional (LFA). He played college football at Auburn.

High school career

After a very successful football career at George Washington Carver High School, Johnson won the Mr. Football Award for best high school football player in the state of Alabama in 2012 after throwing for 3,193 yards and 31 touchdowns. He would go on to participate in the highly regarded U.S. Army All-American Bowl in January 2013. His jersey from Carver was retired on February 6, 2013.

Johnson also starred on the Carver basketball team, earning consecutive first-team all-state honors and an Alabama Mr. Basketball nomination in his final year.

Johnson committed to Auburn University on May 20, 2012, sticking with his commitment through the firing of Gene Chizik and subsequent hiring of Gus Malzahn as head coach of the Tigers.

College career
Johnson came in as a freshman in 2013. He competed for the starting job against Nick Marshall, who became the starter for that season. On October 12, 2013, Johnson earned his first start against Western Carolina. He had 201 passing yards with four touchdowns and an interception. Two weeks later against Florida Atlantic, Marshall was injured again and Johnson replaced him as he had 192 yards, two touchdowns, and an interception.

With starting quarterback Nick Marshall suspended for the first half of the 2014 season opener against division opponent Arkansas, Johnson served in his place completing 12 of 16 passes for 243 yards and two touchdowns within just the first half of the game. After Marshall served his suspension, however, Johnson's role throughout the rest of the 2014 season was clean-up duty against overmatched opponents.

Following Nick Marshall's departure from the Auburn football program after the 2014 season, Johnson was named the starter for the 2015 season following spring practice. Many publications had Johnson listed as one of the favorites to win the Heisman trophy and lead Auburn to the CFP. However, the season got off to a rough start. Johnson threw three interceptions in the opening game against Louisville and two more against (FCS) Jacksonville State. Johnson was benched after another multi-turnover performance to rival LSU. Backup Sean White started the rest of the season, with Johnson being used sparingly. 

Johnson would appear in multiple games in 2016 but, with lackluster results once again.

Collegiate statistics

Professional career
After going undrafted in the 2017 NFL Draft, Johnson was invited to attend the New York Giants rookie minicamp as a tryout player. That summer, he hired an agent and trained in Miami with hopes of earning a professional basketball contract.

On March 3, 2018, Johnson signed with the Columbus Lions of the National Arena League (NAL). He was on the practice squad for the Saskatchewan Roughriders of the CFL from June 28 to July 2, 2018.

Johnson joined the West Virginia Roughriders of the American Arena League and made his debut with the team on April 15, 2019.

In November 2020, he signed with the Rarámuris de Ciudad Juárez of the Fútbol Americano de México (FAM) league ahead of the 2021 season.

Johnson signed another FAM team, the Parrilleros de Monterrey, ahead of the 2022 season. In seven games, he threw for 1,538 yards and 16 touchdowns with six interceptions, earning team MVP honors.

In December 2022, Johnson joined the Caudillos de Chihuahua of the Liga de Fútbol Americano Profesional (LFA), the top league in Mexico, after the FAM league shut down operations.

References

External links
Auburn Tigers bio
Jeremy Johnson profile in the Yahoo's sport site

1994 births
Living people
Players of American football from Montgomery, Alabama
American football quarterbacks
Auburn Tigers football players
Columbus Lions players
Caudillos de Chihuahua players
American expatriate players of American football
American expatriate sportspeople in Mexico